LaGuardia Airport has been the site of several aviation accidents and incidents.

1945
December 30 Eastern Air Lines Flight 14 overran the runway on landing and came to rest in Flushing Bay, one passenger was killed.

1947
May 29 United Airlines Flight 521 crashed after aborting takeoff, 43 of the 48 aboard were killed.
August 8 American Airlines Flight 765, a cargo flight, crashed into Flushing Bay while returning to LGA due to engine problems, both pilots and one passenger of the 5 aboard died.

1957
February 1 Northeast Airlines Flight 823 crashed on takeoff into Rikers Island. Of 101 people aboard, 20 were killed.

1959
February 3 American Airlines Flight 320 crashed on approach into the East River. Of 73 people aboard, 65 were killed.

1960
December 16 Trans World Airlines Flight 266, a Lockheed Super Constellation bound for LaGuardia, collided with a United Airlines Douglas DC-8 over Staten Island, killing all 128 people on board both airliners and 6 more on the ground.

1971
January 4 A Douglas C-47A N7 of the Federal Aviation Administration crashed on approach to LaGuardia Airport. The aircraft was on a flight from Johnstown–Cambria County Airport, Johnstown, Pennsylvania. The cause of the accident was wind shear.

1989
September 20 USAir Flight 5050 bound for Charlotte/Douglas International Airport in Charlotte, North Carolina, crashed after aborting takeoff and rolling off the end of the runway into the East River. The plane broke into three pieces, and two passengers died as a result.

1992
March 22 USAir Flight 405 bound for Cleveland Hopkins International Airport in Cleveland, Ohio, crashed on takeoff at LaGuardia because of icing on its wings. Of 51 people aboard, 27 were killed.

1994
March 2 Continental Airlines Flight 795 to Stapleton International Airport in Denver, Colorado, aborted takeoff in a snowstorm and skidded down the runway into a ditch. 29 passengers and one crew member suffered only minor injuries during evacuation of the aircraft.

1996
October 19 Delta Air Lines Flight 554, a McDonnell Douglas MD-88 was on an early evening ILS/DME approach to runway 13, when right before touchdown, the right wing struck approach lights, then struck the runway and sheared off the landing gear. There were 3 minor injuries among the 63 passengers and crew on board. The aircraft was repaired and placed back into service.

2009

2013
July 22  Southwest Airlines Flight 345, a Boeing 737-700 registration N753SW, from Nashville performed a hard landing that collapsed the nose gear of the aircraft.  Nine people were injured and the plane was written off as a total loss.

2015
March 5 Delta Air Lines Flight 1086 from Atlanta skidded off the runway on landing in snowy weather. The McDonnell Douglas MD-88 operating the flight, N909DL, was severely damaged. Twenty-four people sustained minor injuries during evacuation via the emergency chutes.

2016
October 27 A Boeing 737-700 operated by the new Eastern Air Lines as Flight 3452—carrying Mike Pence, then the Republican Vice Presidential nominee and the Governor of Indiana—skidded off Runway 22 after landing. The aircraft was ultimately stopped by the EMAS bed just before the Grand Central Parkway. No one was injured in the incident.

References

LaGuardia Airport
LaGuardia Airport